Ahmet Sezai Karakoç  (22 January 1933 – 16 November 2021) was a Turkish writer, thinker, community leader, and poet.

Biography
Karakoç graduated from the Faculty of Political Science at Ankara University and worked in the finance sector for many years. He was one of the pioneers of Turkish literature who aimed at bridging traditional Islamic beliefs and modern poetic techniques.

He sees three essential elements for a poet. These three elements he calls Peer Gynt’s triangle, according to Karakoç, exists in Henrik Ibsen’s play, Peer Gynt. These three elements are: Poet must be himself. To be himself a poet must transform. Second element: a poet must be self content. Poet must love his art while being transformed by it. Thirdly, to be self-content, one must feel joy. This joy comes not from living but from letting live.

Bibliography
 "Körfez" (Gulf, 1959)
 "Sesler" (Voices, 1968)
 "Zamana Adanmış Sözler" (Words Dedicated to Time, 1970)
 "Ayinler" (Rites, 1977)

See also
 List of contemporary Turkish poets

References
 Biyografi.net - Biography of Sezai Karakoç 
 Antoloji.com - Poetry of Sezai Karakoç

External links
 Sezai Karakoç - On his poetry
 "KÖPÜK" ŞERHİ (Kitap) -Sezai Karakoç Şiirini Anlama ve Anlamlandırma Yolunda Bir Deneme-Dr. Rıza DURU

1933 births
2021 deaths
Ankara University Faculty of Political Sciences alumni
People from Ergani
Turkish poets
Deniers of the Armenian genocide